A database composite index or multi-column index is an index that is based on several columns.

References

Databases
Database index techniques